Indiana Jones Epic Stunt Spectacular! is a live amusement show at Disney's Hollywood Studios at the Walt Disney World in Florida. Based on the popular and successful Indiana Jones film franchise, it includes various stunts and live reenacted scenes from the series's first film, Indiana Jones and the Raiders of the Lost Ark. It is executive produced by George Lucas and directed by Jerry Rees, with stunt coordination by Glenn Randall. As part of the show prior to the Covid-19 pandemic, selected audience members 18 and older were invited to participate as extras in certain scenes.

Show experience

Indiana Jones Epic Stunt Spectacular! is based on many of the popular stunt scenes from Indiana Jones and the Raiders of the Lost Ark. The show uses various pyrotechnic devices which are incorporated into several of the stunts.

The action starts with Indy braving dangers in a recreation of the Peruvian temple scene from the beginning of the movie. Dangerous spikes, false floors and ancient booby traps test the archaeologist's skills before he attempts to make a getaway with the golden idol. The stunt show then moves on to the busy and audience-participant filled streets of Cairo. Indy and Marion watch street acrobats before events take a turn for the worse and a massive fight scene breaks out. The Cairo street scene concludes with Indy shooting at a Jeep loaded with explosives, producing a fiery conclusion. The final scene of the stunt show recreates the action-packed sequence in which Indy and Marion try to stop the Nazis from flying the Ark to Berlin. The reenactment is complete with a scaled-down version of a German Luftwaffe aircraft with Balkenkreuz (swastikas were used in the show up until the 2000s).  Indy fights a large German mechanic while Marion operates the aircraft's machine gun, blowing away enemies in sight. Indy and Marion are able to make a narrow escape as the airfield is engulfed in flames.

Along with the former Superstar Television and Monster Sound Show, The Indiana Jones Epic Stunt Spectacular! is a show that relies on audience participation as part of the show's entertainment.  Volunteers are chosen from the crowd to perform in the Cairo street scene though they safely stay away from the real stunt work.  Along with the audience, one real stunt actor plant is chosen from the audience to do real work, a fact that has become common knowledge after the many years that the attraction has been open (the plant is usually a man in a loud Hawaiian shirt).

History

The show opened on August 25, 1989, as the first Indiana Jones attraction at a Disney park, and was put on a six-month hiatus in 2000 for refurbishing.

In 2004, the Nazi swastikas on German trucks, aircraft, and actor uniforms were removed and replaced by a Balkenkreuz.

This is the first theme park attraction to use a computer-based show control system in conjunction with a custom made programmable logic controller system to trigger, control and sequence complex live events in real time, controlled by the actors in many cases. All other effects are triggered by a cast member at the booth. The original control system was based on the Amiga computer with software by Richmond Sound Design Ltd. The show is consistently upgrading its electronics and computer elements to keep it up to date. This began a trend in live stunt shows with both Walt Disney World and Universal Studios opening many more similar attractions over the next eight years.

Incidents
On August 17, 2009, 30-year-old stunt performer Anislav Varbanov died from a head injury after rehearsing a gymnastic tumble for the show.

2020 labor dispute 
When Walt Disney World reopened in July 2020 following the COVID-19 shutdown, all stage shows such as Finding Nemo – The Musical, Beauty and the Beast: Live on Stage, Festival of the Lion King, and the Indiana Jones Epic Stunt Spectacular! had remained closed due to a dispute between the Actors' Equity Association and Walt Disney World over allowing performers to wear face masks and providing regular testing.

Merchandise
The Indiana Jones show has two merchandise stores which sell Indiana Jones merchandise and apparel. The truck-shaped merchandise store is located at the attraction's exit, while the much larger Indiana Jones Adventure Outpost is located nearby, past the Prime Time Café.

References

External links

 Walt Disney World Resort - Indiana Jones Epic Stunt Spectacular!

Disney's Hollywood Studios
Epic Stunt Spectacular!
Walt Disney Parks and Resorts entertainment
Echo Lake (Disney)
1989 establishments in Florida